Boots, as a nickname, may refer to:

 Boots Adams (1899–1975), American business executive
 Boots Anson-Roa (born 1945), Filipino actress, columnist, editor and lecturer
 Frederick C. Blesse (1921–2012), American Air Force major general and flying ace
 Boots Day (born 1947), retired Major League Baseball player
 Boots Donnelly (born 1942), American former college football coach
 Boots Hansen, co-founder of Boots & Coots, a well control company
 Boots Mallory (1913–1958), American actress, dancer and model
 Boots Mussulli (1915–1967), Italian-American jazz saxophonist
 Boots Poffenberger (1915–1999), Major League Baseball pitcher
 Boots Randolph (1927–2007), American saxophonist
 Boots Riley (born 1971), American vocalist
 Ernest Ivy Thomas, Jr. (1924–1945), US Marine Corps sergeant

See also 
 
 
 Boots (surname)
 Caligula, Roman emperor whose childhood nickname meant "Little Boots" 
 "The Boot", nickname of New Zealand rugby union player Don Clarke (1933–2002)

Lists of people by nickname